The Las Lozas Volcanics is a Late Carboniferous geological formation in the Las Lozas Valley in the Catamarca Province of northwestern Argentina.

Description 
During the Ordovician, the Famatinian orogeny on Gondwana's western margin laid down large volcanic deposits. Some of these were later found to be younger, of Carboniferous-Pennsylvanian age. It lies beneath Paleozoic sediments and above a metamorphic basement. This volcanic activity occurred concurrently with crustal extension, which may be associated either with the Famatinian orogeny, the Achalian orogeny or a separate event.

The Las Lozas unit has been dated at 320 million years, with previous dates for other units being between 336-298 million years. The rocks erupted during this volcanic episode were formed from much older crust of Cryogenian age, based on isotope dating of zircons. This older crust may have formed when Rodinia broke up.

The structure of the deposits indicates that explosive eruptions involving lava domes were the principal sources of the Las Lozas volcanic deposits. Also present basalts formed lava flows, which may have originated from the lava domes as well. The activity occurred at high temperatures and was issued by fissure vents.

References

Bibliography 

 

Geologic formations of Argentina
Carboniferous System of South America
Carboniferous Argentina
Pennsylvanian Series
Carboniferous volcanism
Volcanism of South America